Eurytorna is a genus of moths of the family Crambidae. It contains only one species, Eurytorna heterodoxa, which is found on Fiji.

References

Acentropinae
Taxa named by Edward Meyrick
Monotypic moth genera
Moths of Fiji
Crambidae genera